The American Empire Project is a book series that deals with imperialist and exceptionalist tendencies in US foreign policy in the early 21st century. The series is published by Metropolitan Books and includes contributions by such notable American thinkers and authors as Noam Chomsky, Howard Zinn, Chalmers Johnson and Andrew Bacevich. The project's goal is to critique what the authors consider the imperial ambitions of the United States and to explore viable alternatives for foreign policy.

The American Empire Project was founded by Tom Engelhardt and Steven Fraser and started publication in 2004. It includes revised or reprinted editions of older books, as well as new books published for the first time.

American Empire Project book list
A partial list of books in the project:

A People's History of American Empire (2008); by Howard Zinn, Paul Buhle, Mike Konopacki
A Question of Torture: CIA Interrogation, from the Cold War to the War on Terror (2006); by Alfred McCoy
Ain’t My America: The Long, Noble History of Antiwar Conservatism and Middle-American Anti-Imperialism (2008); by Bill Kauffman
Blood and Oil: The Dangers and Consequences of America's Growing Petroleum Dependency; by Michael T. Klare
Blowback: The Costs and Consequences of American Empire, Revised edition; by Chalmers Johnson
Crusade: Chronicles of an Unjust War; by James Carroll
Devil's Game: How the United States Helped Unleash Fundamentalist Islam; by Robert Dreyfuss
Dilemmas of Domination: The Unmaking of the American Empire; by Walden Bello
Empire's Workshop: Latin America, the United States, and the Rise of the New Imperialism; by Greg Grandin
Failed States: The Abuse of Power and the Assault on Democracy; by Noam Chomsky
Hegemony or Survival: America's Quest for Global Dominance (2003); by Noam Chomsky
How to Succeed at Globalization: A Primer for Roadside Vendors; by El Fisgón
Imperial Ambitions: Conversations on the Post 9/11 World; by Noam Chomsky
In the Name of Democracy: American War Crimes in Iraq and Beyond; by Jeremy Brecher, Jill Cutler, and Brendan Smith
Iraq: The Logic of Withdrawal; by Anthony Arnove
Kill Anything That Moves: The Real American War in Vietnam; by Nick Turse
Nemesis: The Last Days of the American Republic; by Chalmers Johnson
The Seventh Decade: The New Shape of Nuclear Danger; by Jonathan Schell
The Sorrows of Empire: Militarism, Secrecy, and the End of the Republic; by Chalmers Johnson
The Complex: How the Military Invades Our Everyday Lives; by Nick Turse
The Limits of Power: The End of American Exceptionalism; by Andrew Bacevich
War Powers: How the Imperial Presidency Hijacked the Constitution; by Peter Irons
What We Say Goes: Conversations on U.S. Power in a Changing World: Interviews with David Barsamian; by Noam Chomsky and David Barsamian

See also
 American century
 American exceptionalism
 American imperialism

References

Books about foreign relations of the United States
Metropolitan Books books
Series of books